The 2011 Polish Figure Skating Championships were held in three parts:
 Senior competitions and junior ice dancing were held as part of the 2011 Three National Championships in Žilina, Slovakia on December 16–18, 2010.
 Junior competitions were held in Oświęcim on January 20–23, 2011. Children from Golden and Silver categories had their Cup of Poland competition (equivalent of Polish National Championships) at the same time. Younger ones competed in April.
 Novice competitions and junior synchronized skating were held in Kraków on April 7–9, 2011.

Senior results

The Three National Championships were held simultaneously and the results were then split by country. The top three skaters from each country formed their national podiums.

Men

Ladies

Pairs

Ice dancing

Junior results

Men

Ladies

Pairs

Ice dancing

Synchronized

Novice results

Men

Ladies

Synchronized

External links
 Senior results at the Polish Figure Skating Association
 Junior results at the Polish Figure Skating Association
 Novice results at the Polish Figure Skating Association
 Children results at the Polish Figure Skating Association

2011
2010 in figure skating
2011 in figure skating
2010 in Polish sport
2011 in Polish sport